Kerkenberg is a location in the Oliviershoek Pass Area in Free State, South Africa. The Voortrekkers camped there from mid-October to mid-November 1837 and from there sent out parties to find ways down the escarpment. On 12 November Piet Retief’s daughter Debora painted his name on a rock to mark his 57th birthday.

The site is open to the public.

References

Populated places in the Maluti a Phofung Local Municipality
Tourist attractions in South Africa